Qibing is a community council located in the Mafeteng District of Lesotho. Its population in 2006 was 17,374.

Villages
The community of Qibing includes the villages of Boluma-Tau, Ha 'Mamaribana, Ha 'Mamothibeli, Ha Aujong, Ha Fokase, Ha Hlaoli, Ha Joele, Ha Khang, Ha Khasapane, Ha Khojane, Ha Khothu, Ha Lekhari, Ha Lepolesa, Ha Likhotolo, Ha Machafeela (Qhasisi), Ha Maema, Ha Maoela, Ha Maretlane, Ha Mashapha, Ha Masiu, Ha Masupha (Thabang), Ha Matlakala, Ha Matlamokele, Ha Matsie, Ha Matšoaboli, Ha Mohlehli, Ha Mokhoea (Qhasisi), Ha Molapo, Ha Montoeli, Ha Monyalotsa, Ha Motanyane, Ha Mphobe, Ha Nkalimeng, Ha Nqoloane, Ha Nyapholi, Ha Patisi, Ha Patsa, Ha Patsi, Ha Phatsoane, Ha Phepheng, Ha Rakhapu, Ha Ralebese, Ha Ralerupa, Ha Ralintši, Ha Ralipere, Ha Ramahlape, Ha Ramatsabane, Ha Ratomo, Ha Seeiso, Ha Semona, Ha Sepelemane, Ha Taelo, Ha Tanyele, Ha Tebatso, Ha Tlhoela, Hlakoaneng, Letlapeng, Likokong, Lithabaneng, Mahlakung, Malosong, Manganeng, Marua, Mohlanapeng, Naleli, Sekantšing, Sekoting, Thabana-Tšooana, Tšupane and Vanrooyen.

References

External links
 Google map of community villages

Populated places in Mafeteng District